Đinh Hạng Lang (died 979), dharma name Đính-noa Tăng-noa (頂帑僧帑), was the crown prince of the Đinh dynasty.


Biography
Đinh Hạng Lang was second son of emperor Đinh Tiên Hoàng. He had a very meek personality, and was cherished by his father.

In 978, the emperor designated Hạng Lang as the crown prince, despite oppositions from officials. This designation also made Đinh Tiên Hoàng's first son Đinh Khuông Liễn fret.

In Spring 979, Khuông Liễn dispatched his subordinates to assassinate Hạng Lang. This assassination distressed Đinh Tiên Hoàng and his wives, who could not have done anything to stop it.

So, to assuage his parents, prince Khuông Liễn employed masons to carve the Uṣṇīṣa Vijaya Dhāraṇī Sūtra on 100 columns, dedicated them to his deceased younger brother and other deceased people's souls; and prayed for their release from litigations and strifes. Their remains had fallen into oblivion for almost 1,000 years and were only discovered in 1963.

Legacy
According to professor Hà Văn Tấn, among the archaeological ruins in Hoa Lư, one Buddhist sutra column - which prince Đinh Liễn had commissioned in 973 - was discovered. In 1964 another column was discovered. By 1978, 14 more columns were discovered. On every column the Uṣṇīṣa Vijaya Dhāraṇī Sūtra was carved, followed by prince Đinh Khuông Liễn's prayers, including one for the departed soul of his younger brother Hạng Lang, styled "the Great Virtuous Đính Noa Tăng Noa", whom he had killed.

See also
 Đinh Phế Đế

References

Sources
 
 
 
 
 

979 deaths
Year of birth unknown
Vietnamese princes
People from Ninh Bình province
Đinh dynasty
Vietnamese murder victims